Hardley Flood is a  biological Site of Special Scientific Interest west of Great Yarmouth in Norfolk. It is part of the Broadland Ramsar site and Special Protection Area, and The Broads Special Area of Conservation.

This area of tidal lagoons and reedbeds provides a spillway for the River Chet. The reedbeds provide nesting sites for birds, including nationally important populations of several breeding birds. Three rare flies have been recorded, Elachiptera uniseta, Elachiptera scrobiculata and Lonchoptera scutellata.

The site is open to  the public.

References

Sites of Special Scientific Interest in Norfolk
Ramsar sites in England
Special Protection Areas in England
Special Areas of Conservation in England